"That's Not the Way (It's S'posed to Be)" is a song written by Andy Goldmark and Phil Galdston and performed by Anne Murray.  The song reached #5 on the Canadian Adult Contemporary chart and #12 on the U.S. Adult Contemporary chart in 1984.  The song appeared on her 1983 album, A Little Good News.  The song was produced by Jim Ed Norman.

Chart performance

References

1984 singles
Anne Murray songs
Songs written by Andy Goldmark
Songs written by Phil Galdston
Song recordings produced by Jim Ed Norman
Capitol Records singles
1983 songs